Behavioral Problems is an album and DVD by American comedian Ron White. The album was released by Capitol Records on April 21, 2009 and peaked at number 1 on the Billboard Top Comedy Albums chart. The DVD was also released on April 21, 2009, containing special features, deleted scenes and all completely uncensored and uncut.

Track listing
"Intro" – 0:50
"Oscillate" – 2:22
"No Dogs Allowed" – 1:08
"Don't Shake a Baby" – 2:15
"Got in a Little Trouble" – 4:53
"Lawyers and Dentists" – 10:29
"Tater Tot Goes to Europe" – 4:35
"Implants" – 1:02
"It's a Busy Couch" – 0:57
"The Town Stinks" – 3:03
"I Love This Country" – 0:40
"UFO Tour" – 1:04
"To the Troops" – 1:33
"Man Bag" – 1:31
"Heightened State of Awareness" – 5:58
"I Have a Great Idea" – 3:51
"The List" – 0:58
"Monogamy" – 2:19
"The Lazy Dog" – 2:25
"Not a Lot of People Know" – 0:47
"Pedicure" – 1:43
"All Things Scotch" – 0:51
"Take Me to the Liquor Store" – 1:06
"Tourette's" – 2:35
"Secret Pleasure Zone" – 3:53
"A**I" – 1:37
"Piercing" – 2:01
"It Whistles" – 1:06
"NASA Research" – 1:14

Chart performance

References

2009 albums
Ron White albums
Capitol Records albums